Route 132 is a 2010 Canadian drama film from Quebec. Directed by Louis Bélanger and written by Bélanger and Alexis Martin, the film stars Martin and François Papineau as Bob and Gilles, two men who embark on a road trip and crime spree along Quebec Route 132 following the death of Gilles' son.

The film garnered three Genie Award nominations at the 31st Genie Awards, including Best Actor for Papineau,  Best Supporting Actor for Martin and Best Original Screenplay for Bélanger and Martin.

References

External links 

2010 films
Canadian crime drama films
2010 crime drama films
Films set in Quebec
Films directed by Louis Bélanger
2010s drama road movies
Canadian drama road movies
French-language Canadian films
2010s Canadian films